Pavel Nikolaevich Pol (born: Sinitsyn, 10 May 1887 – 26 April 1955) was a Russian and Soviet actor. People's Artist of the RSFSR (1947).

Biography 
Pavel was born on May 10, 1887. In 1904 he began performing at the People’s Houses in Sokolniki, at the Aquarium. After that, he worked in theaters of Siberia, Arkhangelsk, Novorossiysk, performing various comedic roles, in 1919 he began to play in the Tbilisi Drama Theater, in 1922 he worked in the theater Curved Jimmy. He was one of the organizers of the Moscow Theater of Satire and starred in films.

Selected filmography 
 1924 — Aelita
 1927 — The Girl with a Hatbox
 1954 — The Boys from Leningrad

References

External links 
 Павел Поль on kino-teatr.ru

Russian male film actors
20th-century Russian male actors
1887 births
1955 deaths